Mars Rising is a vertically scrolling shooter written by David Wareing and published by Ambrosia Software for Macintosh computers in 1998. Mars Risings setting and gameplay has been compared to similar scrolling shooters Xevious and Raiden. It was followed by Deimos Rising in 2001.

Reception

Legacy
The 2001 sequel, Deimos Rising, adds 16-bit color, alpha transparency, motion blur, improved artwork and a wider range of enemies and weapons. It was ported to Microsoft Windows.

References

External links
 
 

1998 video games
Ambrosia Software games
Classic Mac OS games
Classic Mac OS-only games
Vertically scrolling shooters
Video games developed in the United States
Video games set on Mars